McDibbs, a music house in Black Mountain, North Carolina pioneered the development of both the non-smoking bar, and the now thriving Asheville area music scene. David Peele founded McDibbs in the late 70's to showcase local talent. His innovations in running McDibbs eventually drew high-profile regional acts like Bela Fleck while retaining a rich bohemian vibe within the establishment. McDibbs reflected a community reminiscent of the Greenwich Village Folk Revival of the 1960s, and reflected a non traditional aesthetic. The community of musicians, artists, and storytellers viewed McDibbs as a cultural landmark that set the stage for the rise of the Asheville area's music and art scene. It was from this environment that current international acts like David Wilcox and Poetry Alive! began at McDibbs.

Founding 

McDibbs was founded in 1978 on Cherry Street in Black Mountain, North Carolina, which is just east of Asheville. Originally established at the former Wonk's Dymaxion Bar, McDibbs offered an immediate change of atmosphere.

McDibbs eventually moved to another location a few doors north to 119 Cherry Street. Moving into the former Anne's Café, a Black Mountain icon around for more than 40 years, McDibbs utilized friends of the community to construct and refurbish the location. Certain staple items in McDibbs were left over from Anne's Café, like the cookstove in the rear of the bar used to house anything from beer to paintings.

Atmosphere 
McDibb's non-smoking environment created an atmosphere that put emphasis on the music. McDibbs became a hangout for both musicians and listeners, and led to the development of a strong sense of community. A.D. Anderson, both a frequent patron and musician, offered this memoir of McDibbs.

I think that was one of the first real differences that set McDibbs apart – it was, by David Peele's design, a true "listening room", as opposed to a bar with music in the background, and performers really dug it. Word got out regionally, probably in large part thanks to Fred and the dance community, and people started coming from Atlanta, Tennessee and beyond. And performers heard and responded – all of a sudden we were able to see Norman Blake, Doc Watson, Taj Mahal, John Sebastian and John Hartford on a regular basis! And since the place only held about 150 seats, there was no bad seat in the house. Plus, there was no "Green Room" for the performers, so they pretty much had to hang out and visit with the fans. It was truly unbelievable, and many a legendary night was experienced.

Of course, it wasn't all folk music and gentle listening. I used to rock the place, with as many as 250 people crammed into that tiny space. I remember exchanging nervous glances with your dad as the speaker cabinets, placed precariously on top of beer boxes, would sway and rock, as the floor sagged and groaned under so many happy feet. Several times we drank the place dry, but it was really rare for there to be any unpleasant drunkenness or weirdness. Women brought their babies and nursed them on the dance floor, then lined them up on blankets behind the speakers to sleep through the ruckus. Good dogs were always welcome – mine would sleep on the stage to avoid being trampled by dancers. Many winter nights were so cold outside and so hot inside that the windows would drip with condensation, and on more than one occasion the evening would end with a snake line of dancers flooding out onto Cherry Street. It was all very groovy.

The rich social environment was coupled with a nostalgia inspired decor. The McDibbs rat served as the mascot for the establishment, often showing up on the covers of the monthly calendars showing the upcoming acts. The rat and its tambourine served as the 'hat' for compensation for artists on a night without a cover charge. A regular would sit at the wood grained bar facing a full mirrored bar. The only beer served was import and microbrewed beer. Bass ale, David Peele's unofficial favorite beer, among others, was often on tap or by the bottle. Also adding to the McDibbs atmosphere were winter plants. Asparagus ferns and Jade plants showed up behind the bar during the winter months. The atmosphere was not that of a typical bar, but of a hangout. Its this environment that is so often emulated in the Asheville area.

McDibbs' role as developing a sense of community can also be seen from the Swannanoa Food Co-op utilizing McDibbs as an occasional center for operation. With McDibbs vacant during daylight hours, the co-op would get permission from David Peele to meet and operate. The development of a community within McDibbs doors led it to be an icon among locals for identity. Locals could identify with the community that came with being a regular at McDibbs.

McDibbs regular and occasional performer Adrienne Hollifield offered her recollection of McDibbs.

McDibbs was THE place to be--the ONLY place to be. David Peele was instrumental
in bringing folk and blues music to the fore in this area with the creation of
McDibbs and the Black Mountain Festival. No one else was doing it at the time.
Now you can go hear different kinds of music in a variety of places. Not back
in the days of McDibbs. He set the standard. And I am proud to say that during
some of the open mic sessions (I'm not sure they were called that), I got to
sing at McDibbs. What an honor! It was also a family place. Clyde and I did a
puppet show there, I know. And when Reuben was born, and when we could manage to
drag our sleep-deprived bodies out for an evening, we could bring our little
tyke to McDibbs to run and play while we enjoyed a beer.

Other comments on what made McDibbs unique:

Closing 
David Peele decided to close McDibbs in 1992 in the interest of his family.

Influence and legacy 

Area businesses regard McDibbs atmosphere as the model for a successful music environment. In a dispute regarding area music establishments, The Mountain XPress printed this statement.

It [The Grey Eagle] was started with an attempt to create a McDibbs type of ambiance for the customers – both old and young. The first lessees, Edd and Lee Ann Knopka, ran a clean place with a friendly, receptive atmostphere, [hosting] a number of charitable events for the community, as we had requested of them.

The legacy of McDibbs' model is shown through the rise in the popularity of the Non-Smoking Bar in the Asheville area. Most notably emulating this model is The Orange Peel, The Grey Eagle, and Jack of The Wood. In November 2008 another music venue opened, using this model.  White Horse Black Mountain www.whitehorseblackmountain.com, owned by Bob Hinkle www.bobhinkle.com, who was the former manager of Harry Chapin, Tom Chapin, the J. Geils Band, Etta James, Manfred Mann, Kenny Rogers, and Dottie West.

In 2011, McDibbs' founder David Peele and Don Talley (who operates a local music website called The Black Mountain Music Scene) launched a new concert series to honor the "listening room" legacy of McDibbs.  The new series is called McDibbs Reunion and features past McDibbs performers.

Always an innovator, David Peele added a new twist to the new concert series.  Past performers and McDibbs audience members play a role in creating the new series and are invited to create their own "reunion" events to celebrate the memory of McDibbs.

National and international performers on the McDibbs stage 

Alex DeGrassi
Andy Irvine
Bela Fleck
Bruce Molsky
Cathy Fink
 Connie Regan-Blake (The Folktellers)
Dan Crary
David Holt
David Wilcox
 De Dannan (Ireland) 
Doc Watson
Gamble Rogers
Gatemouth Brown
George Hamilton IV
Georgia Sea Island Singers
Guy Carawan
Indigo Girls
Jerry Jeff Walker
John Hartford
John Sebastian
John Fahey
John McCutcheon
Jonathan Edwards
Kevin Burke
Kristen Hall
Leon Redbone
Livingston Taylor
Maura O'Connell
Mick Maloney (Ireland)
New Grass Revival
Norman Blake
Peter Rowan
Poetry Alive!
Taj Mahal
Rare Air
Red Clay Ramblers
Robin and Linda Williams
Rosalie Sorrels
Roy Book Binder
Tannahill Weavers
Tom Paley
Tom Paxton
Tony Trischka
Townes Van Zandt
Vassar Clements

Other regional and national performers on the McDibbs stage 
Jim Bickerstaff & Bruce Crichton
Pete Neff
Malcolm Holcombe
Hobey Ford and The Goldenrod Puppets
Phil and Gaye Johnson
Wayne Erbsen
Bill Melanson
Annie Lalley
A D Anderson
Chris Blair
Joe and Karen Holbert
Tracy Drach
The Breeze (Chris Blair, Jon Clegg, Nils Peterson, John Rogers)

References 

Sources for this page were compiled by personal interviews with Adrienne Hollifield and A.D. Anderson

External links 
 http://www.answers.com/topic/david-wilcox-american-musician
 http://www.mountainx.com/opinion/1998/1021letters.php

 http://www.poetryalive.com

1978 establishments in North Carolina
1990 disestablishments in North Carolina
Former music venues in the United States
Music venues in North Carolina
Folk music venues
Buildings and structures in Buncombe County, North Carolina